Balázs Farkas (born 15 October 1979 in Győr) is a Hungarian football player who currently plays for Kecskeméti TE.

External links
 
 hlsz.hu
 fcfehervar.hu

1979 births
Living people
Sportspeople from Győr
Hungarian footballers
Hungary international footballers
Association football midfielders
Győri ETO FC players
FC Sopron players
Mosonmagyaróvári TE 1904 footballers
Újpest FC players
Fehérvár FC players
Vasas SC players
Kecskeméti TE players
Mezőkövesdi SE footballers
Nemzeti Bajnokság I players